The 2008–09 National Premier League (NPL), the first division football league in the nation of Jamaica known as the Digicel National Premier League for sponsorship purposes, was contested by 12 teams. and after 33 matches was split into a champions group and relegation group.  Both groups then play 5 more matches within that group.

League table

Top goalscorers

References

External links 
 League table at official website

National Premier League seasons
1
Jam